Dışkaya is a village in the central district of Uşak, Turkey. The village has existed since the kingdom of Lydia when it was known as Tabala and when it was founded where the Persian Royal Road crossed the Gediz River. The town of Usak is 52 Km Away. The climate of the village is a continental climate.

Population
The village population in 2007 was 123 which was down from 2000 when it was 175 persons. In 1990 the population had been 214.

Economy 
The economy of a village depends on agriculture and husbandry.

The village has a primary school, drinking water network, but no sewerage system. The newly opened health center was shut down in July 2010. The village has asphalt roads connecting the village and has electricity and landline telephone.

References

Uşak Province